NotCompatible is complex malware that infects Android-based phones. It was revealed in late 2014 and was thought to have infected hundreds of thousands of phones.

References

Android (operating system) malware
2014 in computing